V. gigantea may refer to:
 Vallisneria gigantea, the eelgrass, an aquatic plant species in the genus Vallisneria
 Vriesea gigantea, a plant species endemic to Brazil

See also
 Gigantea (disambiguation)